Liam Everett (born 4 October 1973) is an American contemporary artist. Everett lives and works in Sebastopol, California.

Early life and education 

Liam Everett was born in Rochester, New York, in 1973. His father was a theater producer, and his interest in the arts began as a child when he was cast in a production of Samuel Beckett's play Waiting for Godot. He began painting a few years later, and has said that many aspects of his current practice are rooted in the methods he learned from working in the theater. He studied cultural anthropology and philosophy as an undergraduate student at S.U.N.Y. Empire State College in New York before earning a Master's of Fine Arts in painting from the California College of the Arts in 2012.

Work 
Everett creates paintings and sculptures in an abstract style. His first solo exhibition at Altman Siegel Gallery in 2012 featured small oil paintings on masonite board and free-standing and leaning wooden and steel frames draped with painted silk.

Beginning in 2013, Everett began creating paintings on linen. The process for these works involves working on the un-stretched fabric, building up many layers of oil paint and ink, and then eroding those layers through a variety of materials and methods including alcohol, salt, steel wool, and a power sander.

Everett's style has been described as theatrical and performative, and involves placing objects from the studio, which the artist has called "obstructions" and "props," onto the surface of the canvas before making a mark. These objects serve as obstacles that force the artist to work around and through them, dictating his movements and marks.

Teaching 
In 2013, Everett was awarded the Richard Diebenkorn Teaching Fellowship from the San Francisco Art Institute, and subsequently taught two courses and gave several lectures at the college.

Exhibitions 

Everett has exhibited internationally in group shows including A Slow Succession with Many Interruptions at the San Francisco Museum of Modern Art (2016), the Biennale of Painting at the Museum Dhondt-Dhaenens, Deurle, Belgium (2016) and Color Shift at the Berkeley Art Museum and Pacific Film Archive (2014). He has had solo exhibitions at venues including the San Francisco Museum of Modern Art (2017);  Altman Siegel Gallery, San Francisco (2012, 2016, 2018); galerie kamel mennour, Paris and London (2017, 2018, 2019); Eleni Koroneou Gallery, Athens (2015, 2017); Office Baroque, Brussels (2015); and White Columns, New York (2009); among others. In 2017, he was awarded the SECA Art Award from the San Francisco Museum of Modern Art, and featured in a related exhibition at the museum.

Collections 
 The Metropolitan Museum of Art, New York
 San Francisco Museum of Modern Art, San Francisco
 Berkeley Art Museum and Pacific Film Archive, Berkeley
 Fondation Carmignac, Paris, France

References 

1973 births
People from Sebastopol, California
Artists from Rochester, New York
Empire State College alumni
California College of the Arts alumni
Sculptors from California
Painters from California
American male painters
American male sculptors
21st-century American sculptors
21st-century American male artists
21st-century American painters
Living people